Kanamardi is a village in Lääneranna Parish, Pärnu County, in southwestern Estonia, and has only 7 inhabitants (as of 31 December 2011).

References

Villages in Pärnu County